American Idol is an American singing competition television series created by Simon Fuller, produced by Fremantle North America and 19 Entertainment, and distributed by Fremantle North America. It aired on Fox from June 11, 2002, to April 7, 2016, for 15 seasons. It was on hiatus for two years until March 11, 2018, when a revival of the series began airing on ABC.

It started as an addition to the Idols format that was based on Pop Idol from British television, and became one of the most successful shows in the history of American television. The concept of the series involves discovering recording stars from unsigned singing talents, with the winner determined by American viewers using phones, Internet, and SMS text voting. The winners of the first twenty seasons, as chosen by viewers, are Kelly Clarkson, Ruben Studdard, Fantasia Barrino, Carrie Underwood, Taylor Hicks, Jordin Sparks, David Cook, Kris Allen, Lee DeWyze, Scotty McCreery, Phillip Phillips, Candice Glover, Caleb Johnson, Nick Fradiani, Trent Harmon, Maddie Poppe, Laine Hardy, Just Sam, Chayce Beckham, and Noah Thompson.

American Idol employs a panel of vocal judges who critique the contestants' performances. The original judges, for seasons one through eight, were record producer and music manager Randy Jackson, singer and choreographer Paula Abdul, and music executive and manager Simon Cowell. The judging panel for the last three seasons on Fox consisted of singers Keith Urban, Jennifer Lopez, and Harry Connick Jr. Season sixteen brought three new judges: singers Lionel Richie, Katy Perry, and Luke Bryan. The first season was hosted by radio personality Ryan Seacrest and comedian Brian Dunkleman, but Seacrest has been the sole host since the second season.

The success of American Idol has been described as "unparalleled in broadcasting history". A rival TV executive said the series was "the most impactful show in the history of television". It became a recognized springboard for launching the career of many artists as bona fide stars. According to Billboard magazine, in its first ten years, "Idol has spawned 345 Billboard chart-toppers and a platoon of pop idols, including Kelly Clarkson, Carrie Underwood, Chris Daughtry, Fantasia, Ruben Studdard, Jennifer Hudson, Clay Aiken, Adam Lambert, and Jordin Sparks while remaining a TV ratings juggernaut." For an unprecedented eight consecutive years, from the 2003–04 television season through the 2010–11 season, either its performance show or result show was ranked number one in U.S. television ratings.

History

American Idol was based on the British show Pop Idol created by Simon Fuller, which was in turn inspired by the New Zealand television singing competition Popstars. Television producer Nigel Lythgoe saw a version in Australia and helped bring it over to Britain. Fuller was inspired by the idea from Popstars of employing a panel of judges to select singers in audition. He then added other elements, including telephone voting by the viewing public (which at the time was already in use in shows, such as the Eurovision Song Contest), the drama of backstories, and real-life soap opera unfolding in real time. Pop Idol debuted in Britain in 2001 with Lythgoe as showrunnerthe executive producer and production leaderand Simon Cowell as one of the judges, and was successful with the viewing public.

In 2001, Fuller, Cowell, and TV producer Simon Jones attempted to sell the Pop Idol format to the United States, but the idea was initially met with poor responses from all the television networks including Fox. However, Rupert Murdoch, head of Fox's parent company, was later persuaded to buy the series by his daughter, Elisabeth, who had seen the British show. Although Fox's executives wanted to change the format, Murdoch insisted that it should remain the same as the British one. One change was nevertheless made due to the presence of multiple time zones in the United States that made it impractical for the country to vote in the same time period, an additional half-hour results show was therefore added the day following the performance show. The show was renamed American Idol: The Search for a Superstar and debuted in the summer of 2002. Cowell was initially offered the job of showrunner, but turned down the offer; Lythgoe then took over that position. Much to the surprise of Cowell and Fox, it became one of the biggest shows of the summer. With its successful launch in the summer, the show was then moved to January and expanded.  The show grew into a phenomenon largely due to its personal engagement with the contestants by prompting the viewers to vote, and the presence of the acid-tongued Cowell as a judge. By 2004, it had become the most-watched show on U.S. television, a position it then held for seven consecutive seasons until 2011.

However, after a few years of sharp declining ratings starting in 2012, with rating falls of over 20% each season, the fifteenth season would be its last on Fox, ending its run in April 2016. In May 2017, ABC acquired the rights to the series and the program returned for the 2017–18 television season.  The first season of the revived series, or the 16th season overall, started airing in March 2018. Five seasons have been aired on ABC as of May 2022.

Judges and hosts

Judges
The show had originally planned on having four judges following the Pop Idol format; however, only three judges had been found by the time of the audition round in the first season, namely Randy Jackson, Paula Abdul and Simon Cowell. A fourth judge, radio DJ Stryker, was originally chosen but he dropped out citing "image concerns." In the second season, New York radio personality Angie Martinez had been hired as a fourth judge but withdrew only after a few days of auditions due to not being comfortable with giving out criticism. The show decided to continue with the three judges format until the eighth season. All three original judges stayed on the judging panel for eight seasons.

In the eighth season, Latin Grammy Award-nominated singer-songwriter and record producer Kara DioGuardi was added as a fourth judge. Abdul left the show in 2009 after the eighth season as a result of failing to agree to terms with the show producers. Emmy Award-winning talk show host Ellen DeGeneres replaced Abdul for the ninth season, but left in 2010 after just one season. DioGuardi was let go from American Idol in 2010 after two seasons as producers favored a return to the three-person judge panel previously used prior to DioGuardi's appearance on the show. Cowell also left the show in 2010 to introduce the American version of his show The X Factor for 2011. Jackson was the only judge from the ninth season to return for the tenth.

Jennifer Lopez and Steven Tyler joined the judging panel in the tenth season, but both left in 2012 after two seasons. Jackson was the only judge from the eleventh season to return for the twelfth. They were replaced by three new judges, Mariah Carey, Nicki Minaj, and Keith Urban, who joined Jackson in the twelfth season. However, both Carey and Minaj left after one season, and Jackson departed the show after twelve seasons as a judge but would return as a mentor for the thirteenth season in 2014, after which he left the show permanently.

Urban was the only judge from the twelfth season to return as a judge for the thirteenth season. Lopez returned to American Idol for the thirteenth season and was joined by former mentor Harry Connick Jr. After this, Lopez, Urban, and Connick Jr. remained on the show until its cancellation after the fifteenth season in 2016.

Katy Perry, Luke Bryan and Lionel Richie have served as the judges since the revival of American Idol began on ABC in 2018, marking the sixteenth season of Idol.

Guest judges may occasionally be introduced. In the second season, guest judges such as Lionel Richie and Robin Gibb were used, and in the third season Donna Summer, Quentin Tarantino and some of the mentors also joined as judges to critique the performances in the final rounds. Guest judges were used in the audition rounds, Gene Simmons, LL Cool J, Brandy, Mark McGrath and Kenny Loggins in the fourth season, Carole Bayer Sager, Jewel, and Olivia Newton-John in the sixth season, Shania Twain, Neil Patrick Harris, Avril Lavigne, Mary J. Blige, Joe Jonas, Kristen Chenoweth, Victoria Beckham and Katy Perry in the ninth season and Adam Lambert in the fourteenth season.

Hosts

The first season was co-hosted by Ryan Seacrest and Brian Dunkleman following the format of Pop Idol of using two presenters. Dunkleman quit thereafter, resulting in Seacrest becoming the sole host starting with the second season in 2003.

Seacrest has remained as sole host of American Idol ever since, with the exception of the two-year hiatus between 2016 and 2018 as well as April 8, 2019, when Bobby Bones subbed for Seacrest after the latter fell ill. Dunkleman did, however, return for the initial series finale on Fox in 2016 as a guest.

Selection process

In a series of steps, the show selected the eventual winner out of many tens of thousands of contestants.

Contestant eligibility
The eligible age-range for contestants is fifteen to twenty-eight years old. The initial age limit was sixteen to twenty-four in the first three seasons, but the upper limit was raised to twenty-eight in the fourth season, and the lower limit was reduced to fifteen in the tenth season. The contestants have to be legal U.S. residents, can not have advanced to particular stages of the competition in previous seasons, and must not have held a current recording or talent representation contract by the semi-final stage (in previous years by the audition stage).

Initial auditions
For the first eighteen seasons, contestants went through at least three sets of cuts. The first was a brief audition with a few other contestants in front of selectors which may include one of the show's producers. Although auditions can exceed 10,000 in each city, only a few hundred of these made it past the preliminary round of auditions. Successful contestants then sing in front of producers, where more may be cut. Only then can they proceed to audition in front of the judges, which is the only audition stage shown on television. Those selected by the judges are sent to Hollywood. Between 10 and 60 people in each city may make it to Hollywood.

From the nineteenth season onwards, contestants request a Zoom interview and audition remotely for the show's producers. If the audition goes well, they will then invite the contestants to audition in front of the judges, in one of the audition cities.

Hollywood week
Once in Hollywood, the contestants perform individually or in groups in a series of rounds. Until the tenth season, there were usually three rounds of eliminations in Hollywood. In the first round the contestants emerged in groups but performed individually. For the next round, the contestants put themselves in small groups and performed a song together. In the final round, the contestants performed solo with a song of their choice a cappella or accompanied by a banddepending on the season. In the second and third seasons, contestants were also asked to write original lyrics or melody in an additional round after the first round. In the seventh season, the group round was eliminated and contestants may, after a first solo performance and on judges approval, skip a second solo round and move directly to the final Hollywood round. In the twelfth season, the executive producers split up the females and males and chose the members to form the groups in the group round.

In the tenth and eleventh seasons, a further round was added in Las Vegas, where the contestants performed in groups based on a theme, followed by one final solo round to determine the semi-finalists. At the end of this stage of the competition, 24 to 36 contestants were selected to move on to the semi-final stage. In the twelfth season the Las Vegas round became a Sudden Death round, where the judges had to choose five guys and five girls each night (four nights) to make the top twenty. In the thirteenth season, the Las Vegas round was eliminated and a new round called "Hollywood or Home" was added, where if the judges were uncertain about some contestants, those contestants were required to perform soon after landing in Los Angeles, and those who failed to impress were sent back home before they reached Hollywood. In the fourteenth season, the "Hollywood or Home" round was dropped, and a Showcase round was added, where the contestants performed at the House of Blues or auditorium for the judges and a live audience, and these performances determine who makes into the Top 24. In the seventeenth and eighteenth seasons, the showcase round took place in Hawaii. In the nineteenth and twentieth seasons, a showstopper round was used.

Audience voting
From the semi-finals onward, the fate of the contestants is decided by public vote. During the contestant's performance as well as the recap at the end, a toll-free telephone number for each contestant was displayed on the screen. For a two-hour period after the episode ends (up to four hours for the finale) in each US time zone, viewers may call or send a text message to their preferred contestant's telephone number, and each call or text message was registered as a vote for that contestant. Viewers were allowed to vote as many times as they can within the two-hour voting window. However, the show reserves the right to discard votes by power dialers. One or more of the least popular contestants may be eliminated in successive weeks until a winner emerges. Over 110 million votes were cast in the first season, and by the tenth season the seasonal total had increased to nearly 750 million. Voting via text messaging was made available in the second season when AT&T Wireless joined as a sponsor of the show, and 7.5 million text messages were sent to American Idol that season. The number of text messages rapidly increased, reaching 178 million texts by the eighth season. Online voting was offered for the first time in the tenth season. The votes are counted and verified by Telescope Inc.

Semi-finals
In the first three seasons, the semi-finalists were split into different groups to perform individually in their respective night. In the first season, there were three groups of ten, with the top three contestants from each group making the finals. In the second and third seasons, there were four groups of eight, and the top two of each selected. These seasons also featured a wildcard round, where contestants who failed to qualify were given another chance. In the first season, only one wildcard contestant was chosen by the judges, giving a total of ten finalists. In the second and third seasons, each of the three judges championed one contestant with the public advancing a fourth into the finals, making 12 finalists in all.

From the fourth through seventh and ninth seasons, the twenty-four semi-finalists were divided by gender in order to ensure an equal gender division in the top twelve. The men and women sang separately on consecutive nights, and the bottom two in each groups were eliminated each week until only six of each remained to form the top twelve.

The wildcard round returned in the eighth season, wherein there were three groups of twelve, with three contestants moving forward – the highest male, the highest female, and the next highest-placed singer – for each night, and four wildcards were chosen by the judges to produce a final 13. Starting in tenth season, the girls and boys perform on separate nights. In the tenth and eleventh seasons, five of each gender were chosen, and three wildcards were chosen by the judges to form a final 13. In the twelfth season, the top twenty semifinalists were split into gender groups, with five of each gender advancing to form the final 10. In the thirteenth season, there were thirty semifinalists, but only twenty semifinalists (ten for each gender) were chosen by the judges to perform on the live shows, with five in each gender based on the vote and three wildcards chosen by the judges composing the final 13. In the fourteenth season, the top 24 performed at The Fillmore Detroit, starting with the 12 males on one night and then the 12 females on the next night. The following week, the same order went for the top 16, with four males eliminated, followed by four females based on the vote. Then, on the first night of finals, a similar sequence from the thirteenth season was used to determine the final 12, with five of each gender based on the vote and two wildcards chosen by the judges. In the fifteenth season, the top 24 performed at Cathedral of Saint Vibiana in Los Angeles and were split into two groups of twelve and performed twice, one being a solo performance and one being a duet with a former Idol contestant. In each group, the judges chose 7 contestants to advance to the top 14 where the judges chose 4 to advance to the top 10 and remaining 6 contestants were chosen based on the vote. In the sixteenth season, the top 24 performed at the Academy in the Heart of LA, and the show repeated the process from the previous season. However, instead of Idol alumnus as duet partners, superstar celebrity singers were used as the duet partners. In the seventeenth season, the show repeated the process again. However, instead of a top 24, it's a top 20, the contestants performed at the Wiltern Theatre in Los Angeles, and performed solos in one episode, and performed the duets in two episodes. In the eighteenth season, due to the COVID-19 pandemic, the top 20 performed at their homes, and based on the vote, half of the top 20 would advance to the top 10, and the other half would be eliminated. However, a wild card was given to one of the bottom 10 to save them from elimination. In the nineteenth season, the show used a combination of the process from the sixteenth and fourteenth seasons. In the twentieth season, the show repeated the process from the previous season, but they used a top 20 instead of a top 16, and there were no all star duets.

Finals
The finals were broadcast in prime time from CBS Television City in Los Angeles, in front of a live studio audience (except the eighteenth season, due to the COVID-19 pandemic). The finals lasted eight weeks in the first season. From the second to ninth and fourteenth seasons, the finals lasted eleven weeks. The tenth and eleventh seasons lasted for twelve weeks, while the twelfth season lasted for ten weeks. In the thirteenth season, the finals lasted thirteen weeks. The finals lasted seven weeks in the fifteenth season, and six weeks in the sixteenth season. Each finalist performs songs based on a weekly theme which may be a musical genre such as Motown, disco, or big band, songs by artists such as Michael Jackson, Elvis Presley or The Beatles, or more general themes such as Billboard number-one hits or songs from the contestant's year of birth. Contestants usually worked with a celebrity mentor related to the theme. From the tenth to twelfth seasons, Jimmy Iovine was brought in as a mentor for the season. Initially the contestants sang one song each week, but this was increased to two songs from top four or five onwards, then three songs for the top two or three.

The most popular contestants are usually not revealed in the results show. Instead, typically the three contestants (two in later rounds) who received the lowest number of votes was called to the center of the stage. One of these three was usually sent to safety; however the two remaining were not necessarily the bottom two. The contestant with the fewest votes was then revealed and eliminated from the competition. A montage of the eliminated contestant's time on the show was played and they gave their final performance (from the fourteenth season onward, the montage and the final performance were dropped). However, in the sixth season, during the series' first ever Idol Gives Back episode, no contestant was eliminated, but on the following week, two were sent home. Moreover, from the eighth season onwards, the judges may overturn viewers' decision with a "Judges' Save" if they unanimously agreed to. "The save" could only be used once, and only up through the Top 5. In the eighth to tenth and fourteenth seasons, a double elimination then took place in the week following the activation of the save, but in the eleventh and thirteenth seasons, a regular single elimination took place. The save was not activated in the twelfth season and consequently, a non-elimination took place in the week after its expiration with the votes then carrying over into the following week.

The "Fan Save" was introduced in the fourteenth season. During the finals, viewers were given a five-minute window to vote for the contestants in danger of elimination by using their Twitter account to decide which contestant will move on to the next show, starting with the Top 8.

Season finale
The finale is a two-hour episode which is always the last episode of the season, culminating in revealing the winner. For the first, third through sixth and fourteenth through fifteenth seasons it was broadcast from the Dolby Theatre, which has an audience capacity of approximately 3,400. The second-season finale took place at the Gibson Amphitheatre, which had an audience capacity of over 6,000. In the seventh through thirteenth seasons, the venue was at the Microsoft Theater, which holds an audience of over 7,000. Since the show's reboot on ABC, the venue remains the same throughout the entire show (excluding auditions). The eighteenth-season finale was conducted virtually due to the COVID-19 pandemic.

Rewards for winner and finalists
The winner usually receives a record deal with a major label, which may be for up to six albums, and secures a management contract with American Idol-affiliated 19 Management (which has the right of first refusal to sign all contestants), as well as various lucrative contracts. All winners prior to the ninth season reportedly earned at least $1 million in their first year as winner. At first the contract came with a $250,000-plus advance, but dropped to about $62,500 over the Fox years. All the runners-up of the first ten seasons, as well as some of other finalists, had also received record deals with major labels. However, starting in the eleventh season, the runner-up may only be guaranteed a single-only deal. BMG/Sony (first through ninth seasons), UMG (tenth through fifteenth seasons), and Disney Music Group's Hollywood Records (sixteenth through eighteenth seasons) had the right of first refusal to sign contestants for three months after the season's finale. In the fourteenth and fifteenth seasons, the winner was signed with Big Machine Records. Prominent music mogul Clive Davis also produced some of the selected contestants' albums, such as Kelly Clarkson, Clay Aiken, Fantasia Barrino and Diana DeGarmo. All top 10 (11 in the tenth and twelfth seasons, 5 in the fourteenth season, and 7 in the sixteenth season) finalists earn the privilege of going on a tour, where the participants may each earn a six-figure sum.

Series overview

Season synopses
Each season premieres with the audition round, taking place in different cities. The audition episodes typically feature a mix of potential finalists, interesting characters and woefully inadequate contestants. Each successful contestant receives a golden ticket to proceed on to the next round in Hollywood. Based on their performances during the Hollywood round (Las Vegas round from the tenth through twelfth seasons), 24 to 36 contestants are selected by the judges to participate in the semifinals. From the semifinals onward the contestants perform their songs live, with the judges making their critiques after each performance. The contestants are voted for by the viewing public, and the outcome of the public votes is then revealed during a results segment. The results segment feature group performances by the contestants as well as guest performers. The Top-three results also features homecoming events for the Top 3 finalists. The season reaches its climax in a two-hour results finale show, where the winner of the season is revealed.

With the exception of the first two seasons, the contestants in the semifinals onward perform in front of a studio audience. They perform with a full band in the finals. The current musical director is Kris Pooley, who has been with the show since the sixteenth season. In previous seasons, the American Idol band was led by Rickey Minor (fourth through ninth and thirteenth through fifteenth seasons) and Ray Chew (tenth through twelfth seasons). Assistance has also been given by vocal coaches and song arrangers, such as Michael Orland and Debra Byrd to contestants behind the scene. Starting with the seventh season, contestants may perform with a musical instrument from the Hollywood rounds onward. In later seasons, the contestants were allowed to perform with a musical instrument in the auditions. During the first nine seasons, performances were usually aired live on Tuesday nights, followed by the results shows on Wednesdays, but moved to Wednesdays and Thursdays from the tenth through thirteenth seasons. From the fourteenth season onward, there were no separate results shows. On the fourteenth season, the show aired on Wednesday nights, and on the fifteenth season, Thursday nights. From the sixteenth season onward, it aired on Sundays and Mondays.

2002–2016: Fox

Season 1

The first season of American Idol debuted as a summer replacement show in June 2002 on the Fox network. It was co-hosted by Ryan Seacrest and Brian Dunkleman. Randy Jackson, Paula Abdul, and Simon Cowell served as judges.

In the audition rounds, 121 contestants were selected from around 10,000 who attended the auditions. These were cut to 30 for the semifinal, with ten going on to the finals. One semifinalist, Delano Cagnolatti, was disqualified for lying to evade the show's age limit. One of the early favorites, Tamyra Gray, was eliminated at the top four, the first of several such shock eliminations that were to be repeated in later seasons. Christina Christian was hospitalized before the top six result show due to chest pains and palpitations, and she was eliminated while she was in the hospital. Jim Verraros was the first openly gay contestant on the show; his sexual orientation was revealed on his blog, however it was removed during the competition after a request from the show producers over concerns that it might be unfairly influencing votes.

The final showdown was between Justin Guarini, one of the early favorites, and Kelly Clarkson. Clarkson was not initially thought of as a contender, but impressed the judges with some good performances in the final rounds, such as her performance of Aretha Franklin's "Natural Woman", and Betty Hutton's "Stuff Like That There", and eventually won the crown on September 4, 2002.

In what was to become a tradition, Clarkson performed the coronation song during the finale, and released the song immediately after the season ended. The single, "A Moment Like This", went on to break a 38-year-old record held by The Beatles for the biggest leap to number one on the Billboard Hot 100. Guarini did not release any song immediately after the show and remains the only runner-up not to do so. Both Clarkson and Guarini made a musical film, From Justin to Kelly, which was released in 2003 but was widely panned. Clarkson has since become one of the most successful Idol contestants internationally, with worldwide album sales of more than 25 million.

Starting September 30, 2006, this season was repackaged as "American Idol Rewind" and syndicated directly to stations in the U.S.

Season 2

Following the success of the first season, the second season was moved up to air in January 2003. The number of episodes increased, as did the show's budget and the charge for commercial spots. Dunkleman left the show, leaving Ryan Seacrest as the lone host. Randy Jackson, Paula Abdul, and Simon Cowell returned as judges. Kristin Adams was a correspondent for this season.

Corey Clark was disqualified during the finals for having an undisclosed police record; however, he later alleged that he and Paula Abdul had an affair while on the show and that this contributed to his expulsion. Clark also claimed that Abdul gave him preferential treatment on the show due to their affair. The allegations were dismissed by Fox after an independent investigation. Two semi-finalists were also disqualified that year – Jaered Andrews for an arrest on an assault charge, and Frenchie Davis for having previously modeled for an adult website.

The season finale drew more than 38 million viewers, marking Idols biggest audience ever for a single episode. Ruben Studdard emerged as the winner, beating Clay Aiken by a small margin. Out of a total of 24 million votes, Studdard finished just 134,000 votes ahead of Aiken. This slim margin of victory was controversial due to the large number of calls that failed to get through. In an interview prior to the fifth season, executive producer Nigel Lythgoe indicated that Aiken had led the fan voting from the wildcard week onward until the finale.

Both finalists found success after the show, but Aiken out-performed Studdard's coronation song "Flying Without Wings" with his single release from the show "This Is the Night", as well as in their subsequent album releases. The fourth-place finisher Josh Gracin also enjoyed some success as a country singer.

Season 3

The third season premiered on January 19, 2004. Ryan Seacrest returned as host, and Randy Jackson, Paula Abdul, and Simon Cowell returned as judges. One of the most talked-about contestants during the audition process was William Hung whose off-key rendition of Ricky Martin's "She Bangs" received widespread attention. His exposure on Idol landed him a record deal and surprisingly he became the third bestselling singer from that season.

Much media attention on the season had been focused on the three black singers, Fantasia Barrino, LaToya London, and Jennifer Hudson, dubbed the Three Divas. All three unexpectedly landed on the bottom three on the top seven result show, with Hudson controversially eliminated. Elton John, who was one of the mentors that season, called the results of the votes "incredibly racist". The prolonged stays of John Stevens and Jasmine Trias in the finals, despite negative comments from the judges, had aroused resentment, so much so that John Stevens reportedly received a death threat, which he dismissed as a joke 'blown out of proportion'.

The performance of "Summertime" by Barrino, later known simply as "Fantasia", at Top 8 was widely praised, and Simon Cowell considered it as his favorite Idol moment in the nine seasons he was on the show. Fantasia and Diana DeGarmo were the last two finalists, and Fantasia was crowned as the winner. Fantasia released as her coronation single "I Believe", a song co-written by the first season finalist Tamyra Gray, and DeGarmo released "Dreams".

Season 4

The fourth season premiered on January 18, 2005. Ryan Seacrest returned as host, and Randy Jackson, Paula Abdul, and Simon Cowell returned as judges. This was the first full season of the series to be aired in high definition; the finale of the third season was also aired in high definition. The number of those attending the auditions by now had increased to over 100,000 from the 10,000 of the first season. The age limit was raised to 28 in this season, and among those who benefited from this new rule were Constantine Maroulis and Bo Bice, the two rockers of the show.

The top 12 finalists originally included Mario Vazquez, but he dropped out citing 'personal reasons' and was replaced by Nikko Smith. Later, an employee of Fremantle Media, which produces the show, sued the company for wrongful termination, claiming that he was dismissed after complaining about lewd behavior by Vazquez toward him during the show.

During the top 11 week, due to a mix-up with the contestants' telephone number, voting was repeated on what was normally the result night, with the result reveal postponed until the following night.

In May 2005, Carrie Underwood was announced the winner, with Bice the runner-up. Both Underwood and Bice released the coronation song "Inside Your Heaven", with Underwood's version of the song making her the first country artist ever to debut at number-one on the Billboard Hot 100 chart. As of 2015, Underwood has become the most successful Idol contestant in the U.S., selling 16 million albums in the country, while selling a total of 65 million records worldwide.

Season 5

The fifth season began on January 17, 2006. Ryan Seacrest returned as host, and Randy Jackson, Paula Abdul, and Simon Cowell returned as judges. It remains the highest-rated season in the show's run so far. Two of the more prominent contestants during the Hollywood round were the Brittenum twins who were later disqualified for identity theft.

Chris Daughtry's performance of Fuel's "Hemorrhage (In My Hands)" on the show was widely praised and led to an invitation to join the band as Fuel's new lead singer, an invitation he declined. His performance of Live's version of "I Walk the Line" was well received by the judges but later criticized in some quarters for not crediting the arrangement to Live. He was eliminated at the top four in a shocking result.

On May 30, 2006, Taylor Hicks was named American Idol, with Katharine McPhee the runner-up. "Do I Make You Proud" was released as Hicks' first single and McPhee's was "My Destiny".

Despite being eliminated earlier in the season, Chris Daughtry (as lead of the band Daughtry) became the most successful recording artist from this season. Other contestants, such as Hicks, McPhee, Bucky Covington, Mandisa, Kellie Pickler, and Elliott Yamin have had varying levels of success.

Season 6

The sixth season began on Tuesday, January 16, 2007. Ryan Seacrest returned as host, and Randy Jackson, Paula Abdul, and Simon Cowell returned as judges. The premiere drew a massive audience of 37.3 million viewers, peaking in the last half hour with more than 41 million viewers.

Teenager Sanjaya Malakar was the season's most talked-about contestant for his unusual hairdo, and for managing to survive elimination for many weeks due in part to the weblog Vote for the Worst and satellite radio personality Howard Stern, who both encouraged fans to vote for him. However, on the Top 7 results, Sanjaya was voted off.

This season saw the first Idol Gives Back telethon-inspired event, which raised more than $76 million in corporate and viewer donations. No contestant was eliminated that week, but two (Phil Stacey and Chris Richardson) were eliminated the next.

In the May 23 season finale, Jordin Sparks was declared the winner with the runner-up being Blake Lewis. Sparks has had some success as a recording artist post-Idol.

This season also saw the launch of the American Idol Songwriter contest which allows fans to vote for the "coronation song". Thousands of recordings of original songs were submitted by songwriters, and 20 entries selected for the public vote. The winning song, "This Is My Now", was performed by both finalists during the finale and released by Sparks on May 24, 2007.

Season 7

The seventh season premiered on January 15, 2008, for a two-day, four-hour premiere. Ryan Seacrest returned as host, and Randy Jackson, Paula Abdul, and Simon Cowell returned as judges. The media focused on the professional status of the seventh season contestants, the so-called 'ringers', many of whom, including Kristy Lee Cook, Brooke White, Michael Johns, and in particular Carly Smithson, had prior recording contracts. Contestant David Hernandez also attracted some attention due to his past employment as a stripper.

For the finals, American Idol debuted a new state-of-the-art set and stage on March 11, 2008, along with a new on-air look. David Cook's performance of "Billie Jean" on top-ten night was lauded by the judges, but provoked controversy when they apparently mistook the Chris Cornell arrangement to be David Cook's own even though the performance was introduced as Cornell's version. Cornell himself said he was 'flattered' and praised David Cook's performance. David Cook was taken to the hospital after the top-nine performance show due to heart palpitations and high blood pressure.

David Archuleta's performance of John Lennon's "Imagine" was considered by many as one of the best of the season. Jennifer Lopez, who was brought in as a judge in the tenth season, called it a beautiful song-moment that she will never forget. Jason Castro's semi-final performance of "Hallelujah" also received considerable attention, and it propelled Jeff Buckley's version of the song to the top of the Billboard digital song chart.  This was the first season in which contestants' recordings were released onto iTunes after their performances, and although sales information was not released so as not to prejudice the contest, leaked information indicated that contestants' songs frequently reached the top of iTunes sales charts.

Idol Gives Back returned on April 9, 2008, and raised $64 million for charity.

The finalists were Cook and Archuleta. David Cook was announced the winner on May 21, 2008, the first rocker to win the show. Both Cook and Archuleta had some success as recording artists with both selling over a million albums in the U.S.

The American Idol Songwriter contest was also held this season. From ten of the most popular submissions, each of the final two contestants chose a song to perform, although neither of their selections was used as the "coronation song". The winning song, "The Time of My Life", was recorded by David Cook and released on May 22, 2008.

Season 8

The eighth season premiered on January 13, 2009. Ryan Seacrest returned as host, and Randy Jackson, Paula Abdul, and Simon Cowell returned as judges. This season featured the first major change to the judging panel, a fourth judge, Kara DioGuardi, was introduced. Mike Darnell, the president of alternative programming for Fox, stated that the season would focus more on the contestants' personal life.

This was also the first season without executive producer Nigel Lythgoe who left to focus on the international versions of his show So You Think You Can Dance. The Hollywood round was moved to the Kodak Theatre for 2009 and was also extended to two weeks. Idol Gives Back was canceled for this season due to the global recession at the time.

There were 13 finalists this season, but two were eliminated in the first result show of the finals. A new feature introduced was the "Judges' Save", and Matt Giraud was saved from elimination at the top seven by the judges when he received the fewest votes. The next week, Lil Rounds and Anoop Desai were eliminated.

The two finalists were Kris Allen and Adam Lambert, both of whom had previously landed in the bottom three at the top five. Allen won the contest in the most controversial voting result since the second season. It was claimed, and then later retracted, that 38 million of the 100 million votes cast on the night came from Allen's home state of Arkansas alone, and that AT&T employees unfairly influenced the votes by giving lessons on power-texting at viewing parties in Arkansas.

Both Allen and Lambert released the coronation song, "No Boundaries" which was co-written by DioGuardi. This is the first season in which the winner failed to achieve gold album status.

Season 9

The ninth season premiered on January 12, 2010. Ryan Seacrest returned as host, and Randy Jackson, Kara DioGuardi, and Simon Cowell returned as judges. Paula Abdul left the show and Ellen DeGeneres replaced Abdul at the start of Hollywood Week. One of the most prominent auditioners this season was General Larry Platt whose performance of "Pants on the Ground" became a viral hit song.

Crystal Bowersox, who has Type-I diabetes, fell ill due to diabetic ketoacidosis on the morning of the girls performance night for the top 20 week and was hospitalized. The schedule was rearranged so the boys performed first and she could perform the following night instead; she later revealed that Ken Warwick, the show producer, wanted to disqualify her but she begged to be allowed to stay on the show.

Michael Lynche was the lowest vote getter at top nine and was given the Judges' Save. The next week Katie Stevens and Andrew Garcia were eliminated. That week, Adam Lambert was invited back to be a mentor, the first Idol alum to do so. Idol Gives Back returned this season on April 21, 2010, and raised $45 million.

A special tribute to Simon Cowell was presented in the finale for his final season with the show. Many figures from the show's past, including Paula Abdul, made an appearance.

The final two contestants were Lee DeWyze and Bowersox. DeWyze was declared the winner during the May 26 finale. No new song was used as coronation song this year; instead, the two finalists each released a cover song – DeWyze chose U2's "Beautiful Day", and Bowersox chose Patty Griffin's "Up to the Mountain". This is the first season where neither finalist achieved significant album sales.

Season 10

The tenth season premiered on January 19, 2011. Ryan Seacrest returned as host and Randy Jackson returned as a judge. Many changes were introduced this season, from the format to the personnel of the show. Jennifer Lopez and Steven Tyler joined Randy Jackson as judges following the departures of Simon Cowell (who left to launch the American version of The X Factor), Kara DioGuardi (whose contract was not renewed) and Ellen DeGeneres.

Randy Jackson was the only judge from the ninth season to return for the tenth. Nigel Lythgoe returned as executive producer. Jimmy Iovine, chairman of the Interscope Geffen A&M label group, the new partner of American Idol, acted as the in-house mentor in place of weekly guest mentors, although in later episodes special guest mentors such as Beyoncé, will.i.am and Lady Gaga were brought in.

The tenth season is the first to include online auditions where contestants could submit a 40-second video audition via Myspace. Karen Rodriguez was one such auditioner and reached the final rounds.

One of the more prominent contestants this year was Chris Medina, whose story of caring for his brain-damaged fiancée received widespread coverage. Medina was cut in the Top 40 round. Casey Abrams, who suffers from ulcerative colitis, was hospitalized twice and missed the Top 13 result show. The judges used their one save on Abrams on the Top 11, and as a result this was the first season that 11 finalists went on tour instead of 10. In the following week, Naima Adedapo and Thia Megia were both eliminated.

Pia Toscano, one of the presumed favorites to advance far in the season, was unexpectedly eliminated on April 7, 2011, finishing in ninth place. Her elimination drew criticisms from some former Idol contestants, as well as actor Tom Hanks. After Idol, Jennifer Lopez helped guide her career.

The two finalists in 2011 were Lauren Alaina and Scotty McCreery, both teenage country singers. McCreery won the competition on May 25, being the youngest male winner and the fourth male in a row to win American Idol. McCreery released his first single, "I Love You This Big", as his coronation song, and Alaina released "Like My Mother Does". McCreery's debut album, Clear as Day, became the first debut album by an Idol winner to reach No. 1 on the US Billboard 200 since Ruben Studdard's Soulful in 2003, and he became the youngest male artist to reach No. 1 on the Billboard 200.

Season 11

The eleventh season premiered on January 18, 2012. Ryan Seacrest returned as host and Steven Tyler, Jennifer Lopez, and Randy Jackson returned as judges. One more finalist would join the Top 24 making it the Top 25, which was later revealed to be Jermaine Jones. However, on March 14, Jones was disqualified in 12th place for concealing arrests and outstanding warrants. Jones denied the accusation that he concealed his arrests.

Finalist Phillip Phillips suffered from kidney pain and was taken to the hospital before the Top 13 results show, and later received medical procedure to alleviate a blockage caused by kidney stones. He was reported to have eight surgeries during his Idol run, and had considered quitting the show due to the pain. He underwent surgery to remove the stones and reconstruct his kidney soon after the season had finished.

Jessica Sanchez received the fewest votes during the Top 7 week, and the judges decided to use their "save" option on her, making her the first female recipient of the save. The following week, unlike previous seasons, Colton Dixon was the only contestant sent home. Sanchez later made the final two, the first season where a recipient of the save reached the finale.

Phillips became the winner, beating Sanchez. During the finale, fifth season finalist Ace Young proposed marriage to third season runner-up Diana DeGarmo on stage – which she accepted.

Phillips released "Home" as his coronation song, while Sanchez released "Change Nothing". Phillips' "Home" has since become the best selling of all coronation songs, with over 5 million copies sold. Sales figure given here 

Season 12

The twelfth season premiered on January 16, 2013. Ryan Seacrest returned as host and Randy Jackson returned as a judge. Judges Jennifer Lopez and Steven Tyler left the show after two seasons. Randy Jackson was the only judge from the eleventh season to return for the twelfth. This season's judging panel consisted of Randy Jackson, along with Mariah Carey, Keith Urban and Nicki Minaj.

This was the first season since the ninth season to have four judges on the panel. The pre-season buzz and the early episodes of the show were dominated by the feud between the judges Minaj and Carey after a video of their dispute was leaked to TMZ.

The top 10 contestants started with five males and five females, however, the males were eliminated consecutively in the first five weeks, with Lazaro Arbos the last male to be eliminated. For the first time in the show's history, the top 5 contestants were all female. It was also the first time that the judges' "save" was not used, the top four contestants were therefore given an extra week to perform again with their votes carried over with no elimination in the first week.

23-year-old Candice Glover won the season with Kree Harrison taking the runner-up spot. Glover is the first female to win American Idol since Jordin Sparks. Glover released "I Am Beautiful" as a single while Harrison released "All Cried Out" immediately after the show. Glover sold poorly with her debut album, and this is also the first season that the runner-up was not signed by a music label.

Towards the end of the season, Randy Jackson, the last remaining of the original judges, would no longer serve as a judge to pursue other business ventures. Both judges Mariah Carey and Nicki Minaj also decided to leave after one season to focus on their music careers.

Season 13

The thirteenth season premiered on January 15, 2014. Ryan Seacrest returned as host and Keith Urban returned as a judge.  Urban was the only judge from the twelfth season to return as a judge for the thirteenth season. Randy Jackson returned, though Jackson moved from the judging panel to the role of in-mentor. Mariah Carey and Nicki Minaj left the panel after one season. Former judge Jennifer Lopez and former mentor Harry Connick, Jr. joined Urban on the panel. Connick Jr. served as a mentor for Idol in 2010 and 2012. Also, Nigel Lythgoe and Ken Warwick were replaced as executive producers by Per Blankens, Jesse Ignjatovic and Evan Pragger. Bill DeRonde replaced Warwick as a director of the audition episodes, while Louis J. Horvitz replaced Gregg Gelfand as a director of the show.

This was the first season where the contestants were permitted to perform in the final rounds songs they wrote themselves. In the Top 8, Sam Woolf received the fewest votes, but he was saved from elimination by the judges. The 500th episode of the series was the Top 3 performance night.

Caleb Johnson was named the winner of the season, with Jena Irene as the runner-up.  Johnson released "As Long as You Love Me" as his coronation single while Irene released "We Are One".

Season 14

The fourteenth season premiered on January 7, 2015. Ryan Seacrest returned as host, and Jennifer Lopez, Keith Urban and Harry Connick, Jr. returned for their respective fourth, third and second seasons as judges. Eighth season runner-up Adam Lambert filled in for Urban during the New York City auditions. Randy Jackson did not return as the in-house mentor and left the show permanently. Scott Borchetta replaced Jackson as the mentor.

Changes this season include only airing one episode a week during the final ten. Coca-Cola ended their longtime sponsorship of the show and Ford Motor Company maintained a reduced role. The winner of the season also received a recording contract with Big Machine Records.

Nick Fradiani won the season, defeating Clark Beckham. Fradiani became the first winner from the Northeast region. Fradiani released "Beautiful Life" as his coronation single while Beckham released "Champion". Jax, the third place finalist, also released a single called "Forcefield".

Season 15

Fox announced on May 11, 2015, that the fifteenth season would be the final season of American Idol; as such, the season was expected to have an additional focus on the program's alumni. Ryan Seacrest returned as host, with Harry Connick Jr., Keith Urban, and Jennifer Lopez all returning as judges. The fifteenth season premiered on January 6, 2016. The season was shortened by four weeks compared to previous years. During the finale episode, President Barack Obama praised the millions of young people that voted for contestants and pitched that they vote in the upcoming election. The farewell season concluded on April 7, 2016. Seacrest signed off by saying: "And one more time—this is so tough—we say to you from Hollywood, goodnight America", and then he added, "for now."

Trent Harmon won the season against runner-up La'Porsha Renae. Harmon released "Falling" co-written by Keith Urban as his coronation song. Renae's "Battles", third-place finisher Dalton Rapattoni's "Strike A Match" and fourth-place finisher MacKenzie Bourg's "Roses" were also released as singles.

2018–present: ABC revival
In early 2017, Variety reported that Fremantle Media was in talks to revive the show for NBC or for its original network, Fox. A dispute between Fremantle and Core Media Group derailed these plans. In May 2017, ABC was making a bid to revive the program. ABC acquired the rights to the series, and American Idol returned for the 2017–18 television season.Holloway, Daniel, ‘American Idol’: ABC Confirms Plan to Revive Talent Competition Series, Variety, May 9, 2017. Retrieved May 9, 2017.

Season 16

The sixteenth season premiered on March 11, 2018. This was the first season of American Idol to air on ABC. In July 2017, it was announced that Ryan Seacrest would return as host, and by September 2017 it was revealed that Katy Perry, Luke Bryan and Lionel Richie would serve as judges. The season was again shortened compared to the previous season to twelve weeks, with multiple elimination in the final rounds. Unlike previous seasons where only two finalists remained in the final episode, three finalists performed in the finale. On May 21, 2018, the season concluded with Maddie Poppe crowned the winner, beating Caleb Lee Hutchinson as runner-up and Gabby Barrett in third place. Her winning song was "Going, Going, Gone". Caleb Lee Hutchinson released "Johnny Cash Heart" as a single, while Gabby Barrett's song was "Rivers Deep".

Season 17

ABC renewed the revival series for another season. Seacrest returned as host, and Bryan, Perry and Richie returned as judges. The seventeenth season premiered on March 3, 2019. For the finale, the show no longer features separate performance and result shows. On May 19, 2019, the season concluded with three finalists, with Madison VanDenburg eliminated in third place after performing two songs, and the final two performing their last song. For the first time, there were no separate performance and grand finale shows this season. Laine Hardy was crowned the winner and Alejandro Aranda runner-up. Hardy released a single, "Flame", immediately after the win, but Aranda did not. However, Aranda later released a song he performed in the finale, "Tonight", under the name Scarypoolparty on June 28, 2019.

 Season 18 

On May 13, 2019, the series was renewed for an eighteenth season and premiered on February 16, 2020. Seacrest returned as host, and Bryan, Perry and Richie returned as judges. For the first time, due to the ongoing COVID-19 pandemic, from the top 20 to the finale, the contestants performed in their own homes, while Ryan Seacrest hosted the show remotely in his own home in Los Angeles with the judges also in their respective homes. The season was also further truncated, with the top 5 performing in the finale. Each finalist also performed only two songs for the finale. Just Sam was crowned the winner, with Arthur Gunn finishing as the runner-up. "Rise Up", the song Just Sam performed for their audition and reprised on the finale, was released as their debut song.

Season 19

On May 15, 2020, ABC renewed the series for a nineteenth season. Seacrest returned as host, and Bryan, Perry and Richie returned as judges. Later in October, it was announced that Bobby Bones will return as mentor. On November 10, they announced the season will premiere on February 14, 2021. Chayce Beckham was crowned the winner, while Willie Spence finished as the runner-up. "23", the song Chayce Beckham wrote and performed for Top 4, was released as his debut song.

Season 20

On May 13, 2021, ABC renewed the series for a twentieth season. Seacrest returned as host, and Bryan, Perry and Richie returned as judges. On December 2, they announced the season will premiere on February 27, 2022. On December 31, it was announced that Bones would not be returning as a mentor. Noah Thompson was crowned the winner, with HunterGirl finishing as the runner-up. "One Day Tonight", the song Noah Thompson performed for the Grand Finale, was released as his debut song.

Season 21

On May 13, 2022, ABC renewed the series for a twenty-first season. In July 2022, it was announced that Seacrest would be returning as host and that Bryan, Perry and Richie would again be judges. On November 7, it was announced that Season 21 would premiere on February 19, 2023.

Reception
U.S. television ratings
Seasonal rankings (based on average total viewers per episode) of American Idol. It holds the distinction of having the longest winning streak in the Nielsen annual television ratings; it became the highest-rated of all television programs in the United States overall for an unprecedented seven consecutive years, or eight consecutive (and total) years when either its performance or result show was ranked number one overall.
Each U.S. network television season starts in late September and ends in late May, which coincides with the completion of May sweeps.

{| class="wikitable"
|-
! style="width:7%;" rowspan="2"| Network
! rowspan=2| Season
! colspan=2| Premiered
! colspan=2| Ended
! style="width:7%;" rowspan="2"| TV season
! rowspan=2| Timeslot (ET)
! style="width:5%; background:#9cf;" rowspan="2"| Seasonviewers
! style="width:5%; background:#9cf;" rowspan="2"| Seasonranking
|-
!| Date
! span style="width:6%; font-size:smaller; font-weight:bold; line-height:100%;"| Viewers(in millions)
!| Date
! span style="width:6%; font-size:smaller; font-weight:bold; line-height:100%;"| Viewers(in millions)
|-
| rowspan=30 style="text-align:center"| Fox
| rowspan=2 style="text-align:center"| 1
| rowspan=2| June 11, 2002
| rowspan=2| 9.85
| Final Performances: September 3, 2002
| 18.69
| rowspan=2 style="text-align:center"| 2001–02
| style="font-size: smaller;text-align:center;line-height: 100%"| Tuesday 9:00 pm(performance)
| style="background:#cce0ff;text-align:center"| 12.22
| style="background:#cce0ff;text-align:center"| N/A
|-
| Season Finale: September 4, 2002
| 23.02
| style="font-size: smaller;text-align:center;line-height: 100%"| Wednesday 9:30 pm(results)
| style="background:#cce0ff;text-align:center"| 11.62
| style="background:#cce0ff;text-align:center"| N/A
|-
| rowspan=2 style="text-align:center"| 2
| rowspan=2| January 21, 2003
| rowspan=2| 26.50
| Final Performances: May 20, 2003
| 25.67
| rowspan=2 style="text-align:center" | 2002–03
| style="font-size: smaller;text-align:center;line-height: 100%"| Tuesday 8:00 pm(performance)
| style="background:#cce0ff;text-align:center"| 21.03
| style="background:#cce0ff;text-align:center"| 4
|-
| Season Finale: May 21, 2003
| 38.06
| style="font-size: smaller;text-align:center;line-height: 100%"| Wednesday 8:30 pm(results)
| style="background:#cce0ff;text-align:center"| 19.63
| style="background:#cce0ff;text-align:center"| 7
|-
| rowspan=2 style="text-align:center"| 3
| rowspan=2| January 19, 2004
| rowspan=2| 28.96
| Final Performances: May 25, 2004
| 25.13
| rowspan=2 style="text-align:center"| 2003–04
| style="font-size: smaller;text-align:center;line-height: 100%"| Tuesday 8:00 pm(performance)
| style="background:#cce0ff;text-align:center"| 25.73
| style="background:#cce0ff;text-align:center"| 1
|-
| Season Finale: May 26, 2004
| 28.84
| style="font-size: smaller;text-align:center;line-height: 100%"| Wednesday 8:30 pm(results)
| style="background:#cce0ff;text-align:center"| 24.31
| style="background:#cce0ff;text-align:center"| 3
|-
| rowspan=2 style="text-align:center"| 4
| rowspan=2| January 18, 2005
| rowspan=2| 33.58
| Final Performances: May 24, 2005
| 28.05
| rowspan=2 style="text-align:center"| 2004–05
| style="font-size: smaller;text-align:center;line-height: 100%"| Tuesday 8:00 pm(performance)
| style="background:#cce0ff;text-align:center"| 27.32
| style="background:#cce0ff;text-align:center"| 1
|-
| Season Finale: May 25, 2005
| 30.27
| style="font-size: smaller;text-align:center;line-height: 100%"| Wednesday 8:00 pm(results)
| style="background:#cce0ff;text-align:center"| 26.07
| style="background:#cce0ff;text-align:center"| 3
|-
| rowspan=2 style="text-align:center"| 5
| rowspan=2| January 17, 2006
| rowspan=2| 35.53
| Final Performances: May 23, 2006
| 31.78
| rowspan=2 style="text-align:center"| 2005–06
| style="font-size: smaller;text-align:center;line-height: 100%"| Tuesday 8:00 pm(performance)
| style="background:#cce0ff;text-align:center"| 31.17
| style="background:#cce0ff;text-align:center"| 1
|-
| Season Finale: May 24, 2006
| 36.38
| style="font-size: smaller;text-align:center;line-height: 100%"| Wednesday 8:00 pm(results)
| style="background:#cce0ff;text-align:center"| 30.16
| style="background:#cce0ff;text-align:center"| 2
|-
| rowspan=2 style="text-align:center"| 6
| rowspan=2| January 16, 2007
| rowspan=2| 37.44
| Final Performances: May 22, 2007
| 25.33
| rowspan=2 style="text-align:center"| 2006–07
| style="font-size: smaller;text-align:center;line-height: 100%"| Tuesday 8:00 pm(performance)
| style="background:#cce0ff;text-align:center"| 30.11
| style="background:#cce0ff;text-align:center"| 2
|-
| Season Finale: May 23, 2007
| 30.76
| style="font-size: smaller;text-align:center;line-height: 100%"| Wednesday 8:00 pm(results)
| style="background:#cce0ff;text-align:center"| 30.58
| style="background:#cce0ff;text-align:center"| 1
|-
| rowspan=2 style="text-align:center"| 7
| rowspan=2| January 15, 2008
| rowspan=2| 33.48
| Final Performances: May 20, 2008
| 27.06
| rowspan=2 style="text-align:center"| 2007–08
| style="font-size: smaller;text-align:center;line-height: 100%"| Tuesday 8:00 pm(performance)
| style="background:#cce0ff;text-align:center"| 28.80
| style="background:#cce0ff;text-align:center"| 1
|-
| Season Finale: May 21, 2008
| 31.66
| style="font-size: smaller;text-align:center;line-height: 100%"| Wednesday 8:00 pm(results)
| style="background:#cce0ff;text-align:center"| 27.81
| style="background:#cce0ff;text-align:center"| 2
|-
| rowspan=2 style="text-align:center"| 8
| rowspan=2| January 13, 2009
| rowspan=2| 30.45
| Final Performances: May 19, 2009
| 23.82
| rowspan=2 style="text-align:center"| 2008–09
| style="font-size: smaller;text-align:center;line-height: 100%"| Tuesday 8:00 pm(performance)
| style="background:#cce0ff;text-align:center"| 26.25
| style="background:#cce0ff;text-align:center"| 2
|-
| Season Finale: May 20, 2009
| 28.84
| style="font-size: smaller;text-align:center;line-height: 100%"| Wednesday 8:00 pm(results)
| style="background:#cce0ff;text-align:center"| 26.77
| style="background:#cce0ff;text-align:center"| 1
|-
| rowspan=2 style="text-align:center"| 9
| rowspan=2| January 12, 2010
| rowspan=2| 29.95
| Final Performances: May 25, 2010
| 20.07
| rowspan=2 style="text-align:center"| 2009–10
| style="font-size: smaller;text-align:center;line-height: 100%"| Tuesday 8:00 pm(performance)
| style="background:#cce0ff;text-align:center"| 22.97
| style="background:#cce0ff;text-align:center"| 1
|-
| Season Finale: May 26, 2010
| 24.22
| style="font-size: smaller;text-align:center;line-height: 100%"| Wednesday 8:00 pm(results)
| style="background:#cce0ff;text-align:center"| 21.95
| style="background:#cce0ff;text-align:center"| 2
|-
| rowspan=2 style="text-align:center"| 10
| rowspan=2| January 19, 2011
| rowspan=2|26.23
| Final Performances: May 24, 2011 (Tues)
| 20.57
| rowspan=2 style="text-align:center"| 2010–11
| style="font-size: smaller;text-align:center;line-height: 100%"| Wednesday 8:00 pm(performance)
| style="background:#cce0ff;text-align:center"| 25.97
| style="background:#cce0ff;text-align:center"| 1
|-
| Season Finale: May 25, 2011 (Wed)
| 29.29
| style="font-size: smaller;text-align:center;line-height: 100%"| Thursday 8:00 pm(results)
| style="background:#cce0ff;text-align:center"| 23.87
| style="background:#cce0ff;text-align:center"| 2
|-
| rowspan=2 style="text-align:center"| 11
| rowspan=2| January 18, 2012
| rowspan=2| 21.93
| Final Performances: May 22, 2012 (Tues)
| 14.85
| rowspan=2 style="text-align:center"| 2011–12
| style="font-size: smaller;text-align:center;line-height: 100%"| Wednesday 8:00 pm(performance)
| style="background:#cce0ff;text-align:center"| 19.81
| style="background:#cce0ff;text-align:center"| 2
|-
| Season Finale: May 23, 2012 (Wed)
| 21.49
| style="font-size: smaller;text-align:center;line-height: 100%"| Thursday 8:00 pm(results)
| style="background:#cce0ff;text-align:center"| 18.33
| style="background:#cce0ff;text-align:center"| 4
|-
| rowspan=2 style="text-align:center"| 12

| rowspan=2| January 16, 2013
| rowspan=2| 17.93
| Final Performances: May 15, 2013
| 12.11
| rowspan=2 style="text-align:center"| 2012–13
| style="font-size: smaller;text-align:center;line-height: 100%"| Wednesday 8:00 pm(performance)
| style="background:#cce0ff;text-align:center"| 15.04
| style="background:#cce0ff;text-align:center"| 7
|-
| Season Finale: May 16, 2013
| 14.31
| style="font-size: smaller;text-align:center;line-height: 100%"| Thursday 8:00 pm(results)
| style="background:#cce0ff;text-align:center"| 14.65
| style="background:#cce0ff;text-align:center"| 9
|-
| rowspan=2 style="text-align:center"| 13
| rowspan=2| January 15, 2014
| rowspan=2| 15.19
| Final Performances: May 20, 2014 (Tues)
| 6.76
| rowspan=2 style="text-align:center"| 2013–14
| style="font-size: smaller;text-align:center;line-height: 100%"| Wednesday 8:00 pm(performance)
| style="background:#cce0ff;text-align:center"| 11.94
| style="background:#cce0ff;text-align:center"| 17
|-
| Season Finale: May 21, 2014 (Wed)
| 10.53
| style="font-size: smaller;text-align:center;line-height: 100%"| Thursday 8:00 pm(results)
| style="background:#cce0ff;text-align:center"| 11.43
| style="background:#cce0ff;text-align:center"| 22
|-
| rowspan=2 style="text-align:center"| 14
| rowspan=2| January 7, 2015
| rowspan=2| 11.20
| Final Performances: May 12, 2015 (Tues)
| 5.55
| rowspan=2 style="text-align:center"| 2014–15
| style="font-size: smaller;text-align:center;line-height: 100%"| Wednesday 8:00 pm
| style="background:#cce0ff;text-align:center"| 10.31
| style="background:#cce0ff;text-align:center"| 41
|-
| Season Finale: May 13, 2015 (Wed)
| 8.03
| style="font-size: smaller;text-align:center;line-height: 100%"| Thursday 8:00 pm(until March 12)
| style="background:#cce0ff;text-align:center"| 11.55
| style="background:#cce0ff;text-align:center"| 28
|-
| rowspan=2 style="text-align:center"| 15
| rowspan=2| January 6, 2016
| rowspan=2| 10.96
| Final Performances: April 6, 2016
| 9.70
|rowspan=2 style="text-align:center"| 2015–16
|style="font-size: smaller;text-align:center;line-height: 100%"| Wednesday 8:00 pm(until February 24)
|style="background:#cce0ff;text-align:center"| 11.52
|style="background:#cce0ff;text-align:center"| 19
|-
| Season Finale: April 7, 2016
| 13.30
|style="font-size: smaller;text-align:center;line-height: 100%"| Thursday 8:00 pm
|style="background:#cce0ff;text-align:center"| 11.13
|style="background:#cce0ff;text-align:center"| 23
|-
| rowspan=12 style="text-align:center"| ABC
| rowspan=2 style="text-align:center"| 16
| rowspan=2| March 11, 2018
| rowspan=2| 10.48
| Final Performances: May 20, 2018
| 7.47
|rowspan=2 style="text-align:center"| 2017–18
|style="font-size: smaller;text-align:center;line-height: 100%"| Sunday 8:00 pm
|style="background:#cce0ff;text-align:center"| 9.57
|style="background:#cce0ff;text-align:center"| 31
|-
| Season Finale: May 21, 2018
| 8.63
|style="font-size: smaller;text-align:center;line-height: 100%"| Monday 8:00 pm(until April 23)
|style="background:#cce0ff;text-align:center"| 9.51
|style="background:#cce0ff;text-align:center"| 32
|-
| rowspan=2 style="text-align:center"| 17
| rowspan=2| March 3, 2019
| rowspan=2| 8.65
| rowspan=2| Final Performances/Season Finale: May 19, 2019
| rowspan=2| 8.74
|rowspan=2 style="text-align:center"| 2018–19
|style="font-size: smaller;text-align:center;line-height: 100%"| Sunday 8:00 pm
|style="background:#cce0ff;text-align:center"| 9.10
|style="background:#cce0ff;text-align:center"| 32
|-
|style="font-size: smaller;text-align:center;line-height: 100%"| Monday 8:00 pm(until April 22)
|style="background:#cce0ff;text-align:center"| 8.00
|style="background:#cce0ff;text-align:center"| 42
|-
| rowspan=2 style="text-align:center"| 18
| rowspan=2| February 16, 2020
| rowspan=2| 8.07
| rowspan=2| Final Performances/Season Finale: May 17, 2020
| rowspan=2| 7.28
|rowspan=2 style="text-align:center"| 2019–20
|style="font-size: smaller;text-align:center;line-height: 100%"| Sunday 8:00 pm
|style="background:#cce0ff;text-align:center"| 8.34
|style="background:#cce0ff;text-align:center"| 32
|-
|style="font-size: smaller;text-align:center;line-height: 100%"| Monday 8:00 pm(until )
|style="background:#cce0ff;text-align:center"| 8.54
|style="background:#cce0ff;text-align:center"| 30
|-
| rowspan=2 style="text-align:center"| 19
| rowspan=2| February 14, 2021
| rowspan=2| 6.95
| rowspan=2| Final Performances/Season Finale: May 23, 2021
| rowspan=2| 6.50
|rowspan=2 style="text-align:center"| 2020–21
|style="font-size: smaller;text-align:center;line-height: 100%"| Sunday 8:00 pm
|style="background:#cce0ff;text-align:center"| 7.42
|style="background:#cce0ff;text-align:center"| 25
|-
|style="font-size: smaller;text-align:center;line-height: 100%"| Monday 8:00 pm(until April 19)
|style="background:#cce0ff;text-align:center"| 6.24
|style="background:#cce0ff;text-align:center"| 39
|-
| rowspan=2 style="text-align:center"| 20
| rowspan=2| February 27, 2022
| rowspan=2| 6.30
| rowspan=2| Final Performances/Season Finale: May 22, 2022
| rowspan=2| 6.49
|rowspan=2 style="text-align:center"| 2021–22
|style="font-size: smaller;text-align:center;line-height: 100%"| Sunday 8:00 pm
|style="background:#cce0ff;text-align:center"| 7.29
|style="background:#cce0ff;text-align:center"| 25
|-
|style="font-size: smaller;text-align:center;line-height: 100%"| Monday 8:00 pm(until May 2)
|style="background:#cce0ff;text-align:center"| 6.99
|style="background:#cce0ff;text-align:center"| 28
|-
| rowspan=2 style="text-align:center"| 21
| rowspan=2| February 19, 2023
| rowspan=2| 5.27
| rowspan=2| Final Performances/Season Finale: 
| rowspan=2| 
|rowspan=2 style="text-align:center"| 2022–23
|style="font-size: smaller;text-align:center;line-height: 100%"| Sunday 8:00 pm
|style="background:#cce0ff;text-align:center"| 
|style="background:#cce0ff;text-align:center"| 
|-
|style="font-size: smaller;text-align:center;line-height: 100%"| 
|style="background:#cce0ff;text-align:center"| 
|style="background:#cce0ff;text-align:center"| 
|}American Idol premiered in June 2002 and became the surprise summer hit show of 2002. The first show drew 9.9 million viewers, giving Fox the best viewing figure for the 8.30 pm spot in over a year. The audience steadily grew, and by finale night, the audience had averaged 23 million, with more than 40 million watching some part of that show. That episode was placed third amongst all age groups, but more importantly it led in the 18–49 demographic, the age group most valued by advertisers.

The growth continued into the next season, starting with a season premiere of 26.5 million. The season attracted an average of 21.7 million viewers, and was placed second overall amongst the 18–49 age group. The finale night when Ruben Studdard won over Clay Aiken was also the highest-rated ever American Idol episode at 38.1 million for the final hour. By the third season, the show had become the top show in the 18–49 demographic a position it has held for all subsequent years up to and including the tenth season, and its competition stages ranked first in the nationwide overall ratings. By the fourth season, American Idol had become the most-watched series amongst all viewers on American TV for the first time, with an average viewership of 26.8 million. The show reached its peak in the fifth season with numbers averaging 30.6 million per episode, and this season remains the highest-rated of the series.

The sixth season premiered with the series' highest-rated debut episode and a few of its succeeding episodes rank among the most-watched episodes of American Idol. During this time, many television executives begun to regard the show as a programming force unlike any seen before, as its consistent dominance of up to two hours two or three nights a week exceeded the 30- or 60-minute reach of previous hits such as NBC's The Cosby Show. The show was dubbed "the Death Star", and competing networks often rearranged their schedules in order to minimize losses. However, the sixth season also showed a steady decline in viewership over the course of the season. The season finale saw a drop in ratings of 16% from the previous year. The sixth season was the first season wherein the average results show rated higher than the competition stages (unlike in the previous seasons), and became the second-highest-rated of the series after the preceding season.

The loss of viewers continued into the seventh season. The premiere was down 11% among total viewers, and the results show in which Kristy Lee Cook was eliminated delivered its lowest-rated Wednesday show among the 18–34 demo since the first season in 2002. However, the ratings rebounded for the seventh-season finale with the excitement over the battle of the Davids, and improved over the sixth season as the series' third most watched finale. The strong finish of season seven also helped Fox become the most watched TV network in the country for the first time since its inception, a first ever in American television history for a non-Big Three major broadcast network. Overall ratings for the season were down 10% from the sixth season, which is in line with the fall in viewership across all networks due in part to the 2007–2008 Writers Guild of America strike.

The declining trend however continued into the eighth season, as total viewers numbers fell by 5–10% for early episodes compared to the seventh season, and by 9% for the finale. In the ninth season, Idol six-year extended streak of perfection in the ratings was broken, when NBC's coverage of the 2010 Winter Olympics on February 17 beat Idol in the same time slot with 30.1 million viewers over Idols 18.4 million. Nevertheless, American Idol overall finished its ninth season as the most watched TV series for the sixth year running, breaking the previous record of five consecutive seasons achieved by CBS' All in the Family and NBC's The Cosby Show.

In the tenth season, the total viewer numbers for the first week of shows fell 12–13%, and by up to 23% in the 18–49 demo compared to the ninth season. Later episodes, however, retained viewers better, and the season ended on a high with a significant increase in viewership for the finale – up 12% for the adults 18–49 demographic and a 21% increase in total viewers from the ninth-season finale. While the overall viewer number has increased this season, its viewer demographics have continued to age year on year – the median age this season was 47.2 compared to a median age of 32.1 in its first season. The demographics also became "whiter" over time and less diverse. Nevertheless, in the 2010–11 television season, Fox maintained its lead on over other networks with its seventh consecutive season of victory overall in the 18–49 demographic ratings in the United States.

The eleventh season, however, suffered a steep drop in ratings, a drop attributed by some to the arrival of new shows such as The Voice and The X Factor. The ratings for the first two episodes of the eleventh season fell 16–21% in overall viewer numbers and 24–27% in the 18/49 demo, while the season finale fell 27% in total viewer number and 30% in the 18–49 demo. The average viewership for the season fell below 20 million viewers the first time since 2003, a drop of 23% in total viewers and 30% in the 18/49 demo. For the first time in eight years, American Idol lost the leading position in both the total viewers number and the 18/49 demo, coming in second to NBC Sunday Night Football, although the strengths of Idol in its second year in the Wednesday-Thursday primetime slots helped Fox achieve the longest period of 18–49 demographic victory in the Nielsen ratings, standing at 8 straight years from 2004 to 2012.

The loss of viewers continued into the twelfth season, which saw the show hitting a number of series low in the 18–49 demo. The finale had 7.2 million fewer viewers than the previous season, and saw a drop of 44% in the 18–49 demo. The season viewers averaged at 13.3 million, a drop of 24% from the previous season. The thirteenth season suffered a huge decline in the 18–49 demographic, a drop of 28% from the twelfth season, and American Idol lost its Top 10 position in the Nielsen ratings by the end of the 2013–14 television season for the first time since its entry to the rankings in 2003 as a result, and never regained its Top 10 position by the series' end in 2016.

The continuing decline influenced further changes for the fourteenth season, including the loss of Coca-Cola as the show's major sponsor, and a decision to only broadcast one, two-hour show per week during the top 12 rounds (with results from the previous week integrated into the performance show, rather than having a separate results show). On May 11, 2015, prior to the fourteenth-season finale, Fox announced that the fifteenth season of American Idol would be its last. Despite these changes, the show's ratings would decline more sharply. The fourteenth-season finale was the lowest-rated finale ever, with an average of only 8.03 million viewers watching the finale. The show's ratings, however, rebounded in its final season and ended its run in 2016 as Fox's first-ever program to conclude its run without dropping from the Nielsen Top 30 most-watched television shows in each of its seasons.

For the revived series on ABC, the ratings were lower but remained stable compared to previous seasons on Fox. The finale of the seventeenth season was slightly more watched than the sixteenth.

Critical reception
Early reviews were mixed in their assessment. Ken Tucker of Entertainment Weekly considered that "As TV, American Idol is crazily entertaining; as music, it's dust-mote inconsequential". Others, however, thought that "the most striking aspect of the series was the genuine talent it revealed". It was also described as a "sadistic musical bake-off", and "a romp in humiliation". Other aspects of the show have attracted criticisms. The product placement in the show in particular was noted, and some critics were harsh about what they perceived as its blatant commercial calculations – Karla Peterson of The San Diego Union-Tribune charged that American Idol is "a conniving multimedia monster" that has "absorbed the sin of our debauched culture and spit them out in a lump of reconstituted evil". The decision to send the first season winner to sing the national anthem at the Lincoln Memorial on the first anniversary of the September 11 attacks in 2002 was also poorly received by many. Lisa de Moraes of The Washington Post noted sarcastically that "The terrorists have won" and, with a sideswipe at the show's commercialism and voting process, that the decision as to who "gets to turn this important site into just another cog in the 'Great American Idol Marketing Mandala' is in the hands of the millions of girls who have made American Idol a hit. Them and a handful of phone-redialer geeks who have been clocking up to 10,000 calls each week for their contestant of choice (but who, according to Fox, are in absolutely no way skewing the outcome)."

Some of the later writers about the show were more positive, Michael Slezak, again of Entertainment Weekly, thought that "for all its bloated, synthetic, product-shilling, money-making trappings, Idol provides a once-a-year chance for the average American to combat the evils of today's music business." Singer Sheryl Crow, who was later to act as a mentor on the show, however took the view that the show "undermines art in every way and promotes commercialism". Pop music critic Ann Powers nevertheless suggested that Idol has "reshaped the American songbook", "led us toward a new way of viewing ourselves in relationship to mainstream popular culture", and connects "the classic Hollywood dream to the multicentered popular culture of the future." Others focused on the personalities in the show; Ramin Setoodeh of Newsweek accused judge Simon Cowell's cruel critiques in the show of helping to establish in the wider world a culture of meanness, that "Simon Cowell has dragged the rest of us in the mud with him." Some such as singer John Mayer disparaged the contestants, suggesting that those who appeared on Idol are not real artists with self-respect.

Some in the entertainment industry were critical of the star-making aspect of the show. Usher, a mentor on the show, bemoaning the loss of the "true art form of music", thought that shows like American Idol made it seem "so easy that everyone can do it, and that it can happen overnight", and that "television is a lie". Musician Michael Feinstein, while acknowledging that the show had uncovered promising performers, said that American Idol "isn't really about music. It's about all the bad aspects of the music business – the arrogance of commerce, this sense of 'I know what will make this person a star; artists themselves don't know.' " That American Idol is seen to be a fast track to success for its contestants has been a cause of resentment for some in the industry. LeAnn Rimes, commenting on Carrie Underwood winning Best Female Artist in Country Music Awards over Faith Hill in 2006, said that "Carrie has not paid her dues long enough to fully deserve that award". It is a common theme that has been echoed by many others. Elton John, who had appeared as a mentor in the show but turned down an offer to be a judge on American Idol, commenting on talent shows in general, said that "there have been some good acts but the only way to sustain a career is to pay your dues in small clubs".  American Idol revolutionized American pop culture and the pop idol process and has provided an opportunity for many to bypass the small club scene and allow a much larger audience to participate in and select the next potential chart topping performer.

The success of the show's alumni, however, has led to a more positive assessment of the show, and the show was described as having "proven it has a valid way to pick talent and a proven way to sell records". While the industry is divided on the show success, its impact is felt particularly strongly in the country music format. According to a CMT exec, reflecting on the success of Idol alumni in the country genre, "if you want to try and get famous fast by going to a cattle call audition on TV, Idol reasonably remains the first choice for anyone", and that country music and Idol "go together well".American Idol was nominated for the Emmy's Outstanding Reality Competition Program for nine years but never won. Director Bruce Gower won a Primetime Emmy Award for Outstanding Directing For A Variety, Music Or Comedy Series in 2009, and the show won a Creative Arts Emmys each in 2007 and 2008, three in 2009, and two in 2011, as well as a Governor's Award in 2007 for its Idol Gives Back edition. It won the People's Choice Award, which honors the popular culture of the previous year as voted by the public, for favorite competition/reality show in 2005, 2006, 2007, 2010, 2011 and 2012. It won the first Critics' Choice Television Award in 2011 for Best Reality Competition.

In 2013, TV Guide ranked the series No. 48 on its list of the 60 Best Series of All Time.

Geographical, ethnic, and gender bias
Throughout the series, twelve of the seventeen Idol winners, including its first five, had come from the Southern United States. A large number of other finalists during the series' run have also hailed from the American South, including Clay Aiken, Kellie Pickler, and Chris Daughtry, who are all from North Carolina. In 2012, an analysis of the 131 contestants who have appeared in the finals of all seasons of the show up to that point found that 48% have some connection to the Southern United States.

The show itself was popular in the Southern United States, with households in the Southeastern United States 10% more likely to watch American Idol during the eighth season in 2009, and those in the East Central region, such as Kentucky, were 16 percent more likely to tune into the series. Data from Nielsen SoundScan, a music-sales tracking service, showed that of the 47 million CDs sold by Idol contestants through January 2010, 85 percent were by contestants with ties to the American South.

Theories given for the success of Southerners on Idol have been: more versatility with musical genres, as the Southern U.S. is home to several music genre scenes; not having as many opportunities to break into the pop music business; text-voting due to the South having the highest percentage of cell-phone only households; and the strong heritage of music and singing, which is notable in the Bible Belt, where it is in church that many people get their start in public singing. Others also suggest that the Southern character of these contestants appeal to the South, as well as local pride. According to fifth season winner Taylor Hicks, who is from the state of Alabama, "People in the South have a lot of pride ... So, they're adamant about supporting the contestants who do well from their state or region."

For five consecutive seasons, starting in the seventh season, the title was given to a white male who plays the guitar – a trend that Idol pundits call the "White guy with guitar" or "WGWG" factor. Just hours before the eleventh-season finale, where Phillip Phillips was named the winner, Richard Rushfield, author of the book American Idol: The Untold Story, said, "You have this alliance between young girls and grandmas and they see it, not necessarily as a contest to create a pop star competing on the contemporary radio, but as .... who's the nicest guy in a popularity contest", he says, "And that has led to this dynasty of four, and possibly now five, consecutive, affable, very nice, good-looking white boys."

Controversy

The show was criticized in earlier seasons over the onerous contract contestants had to sign that gave excessive control to 19 Entertainment over their future careers and handed a large part of their future earnings to the management.

Individual contestants have generated controversy in this competition for their past actions or for being 'ringers' planted by the producers. A number of contestants have been disqualified for various reasons, such as for having an existing contract or undisclosed criminal record, although the show has also been accused of a double standard for disqualifying some but not others.

Voting results have been a consistent source of controversy. The mechanism of voting has aroused considerable criticism, most notably in the second season when Ruben Studdard beat Clay Aiken in a close vote, and in the eighth season, when the massive increase in text votes fueled the texting controversy. Concerns about power voting have been expressed from the first season. Since 2004, votes also have been affected to a limited degree by online communities such as DialIdol and Vote for the Worst.

Cultural impact

Television
The enormous success of the show and the revenue it generated were transformative for the Fox Broadcasting Company. American Idol and other shows such as Survivor and Who Wants to Be a Millionaire were credited for expanding reality television programming in the United States in the 1990s and 2000s, and Idol became the most watched non-scripted primetime television series, which it remained for almost a decade, from 2003 to 2012, breaking records on U.S. television (dominated by drama shows and sitcoms in the preceding decades).

The show pushed Fox to become the number one U.S. TV network among adults aged 18–49, the key demographic coveted by advertisers, for an unprecedented eight consecutive years by 2012. Its success also helped lift the ratings of other shows that were scheduled around it such as House and Bones, and Idol, for years, was Fox's strongest platform primetime television program for promoting eventual hit shows of the 2010s (of the same network) such as Glee, New Girl and Empire. The show, its creator Simon Fuller claimed, "saved Fox".

The show's massive success in the mid-2000s to early 2010s spawned a number of imitating singing-competition shows, such as Rock Star, Nashville Star, The Voice, Rising Star, The Sing-Off, and The X Factor.  The number of imitative singing shows on American television had reached 17 by 2016. Its format also served as a blueprint for non-singing TV shows such as Dancing with the Stars and So You Think You Can Dance, most of which contribute to the current highly competitive reality TV landscape on American television.

Music

As one of the most successful shows on U.S. television history, American Idol has had a strong impact not just on television, but also in the wider world of entertainment. It helped create a number of highly successful recording artists, such as Kelly Clarkson, Daughtry and Carrie Underwood, as well as others of varying notability. The alumni of the show have received between them 54 Grammy nominations and 13 Grammy awards by 2016, with Carrie Underwood winning seven.

Various American Idol alumni had success on various record charts around the world; in the U.S. they had achieved 345 number ones on the Billboard charts in its first 10 years, and 458 by its last year of broadcast in 2016, with 100 achieved by Kelly Clarkson alone. According to Fred Bronson, author of books on the Billboard charts, no other entity has ever created as many hit-making artists and bestselling albums and singles. In 2007, American Idol alums accounted for 2.1% of all music sales. Its alumni have a massive impact on radio; in 2007, American Idol had become "a dominant force in radio" according to Rich Meyer, president of the radio station monitoring research company Mediabase. By 2010, four winners each had more than a million radio spins, with Kelly Clarkson leading the field with over four million spins.

At the end of the show's run on Fox in 2016, Idol's contestants have sold more than 60 million albums in the US, resulting in more than 80 Platinum records and 95 Gold records. Its participants have generated more than 450 Billboard No. 1 hits and sold more than 260 million digital downloads.

Film and theater

The impact of American Idol was also strongly felt in musical theater, where many of Idol alumni have forged successful careers. The striking effect of former American Idol contestants on Broadway has been noted and commented on. The casting of a popular Idol contestant can lead to significantly increased ticket sales. Other alumni have gone on to work in television and films, the most notable being Jennifer Hudson who, on the recommendation of the Idol vocal coach Debra Byrd, won a role in Dreamgirls and eventually went on to win an Academy Award for her performance. She later became the show's first and only alumnus ever to win the EGOT (Emmy, Grammy, Oscar, Tony).

In 2007, a musical based on the show, Idol: The Musical, played off-Broadway. The musical closed after its official opening night.

Revenue and commercial ventures

The dominance of American Idol in the ratings had made it the most profitable show in U.S. TV for many years. The show was estimated to generate $900 million for the year 2004 through sales of TV ads, albums, merchandise and concert tickets. By the seventh season, the show was estimated to earn around $900 million from its ad revenue alone, not including ancillary sponsorship deals and other income. One estimate puts the total TV revenue for the first eight seasons of American at $6.4 billion. Sponsors that bought fully integrated packages can expect a variety of promotions of their products on the show, such as product placement, adverts and product promotion integrated into the show, and various promotional opportunities. Other off-air promotional partners pay for the rights to feature "Idol" branding on their packaging, products and marketing programs. American Idol also partnered with Disney in its theme park attraction The American Idol Experience.

Advertising revenueAmerican Idol became the most expensive series on broadcast networks for advertisers starting the fourth season, and by the next season, it had broken the record in advertising rate for a regularly scheduled prime-time network series, selling over $700,000 for a 30-seconds slot, and reaching up to $1.3 million for the finale. Its ad prices reached a peak in the seventh season at $737,000. Estimated revenue more than doubled from $404 million in the third season to $870 million in the sixth season. While that declined from the eighth season onwards, it still earned significantly more than its nearest competitor, with advertising revenue topping $800 million annually the next few seasons. However, the sharp drop in ratings in the eleventh season also resulted in a sharp drop in advertising rate for the twelfth season, and the show lost its leading position as the costliest show for advertisers.  By 2014, ad revenue from had fallen to $427 million where a 30-second spot went for less than $300,000.  For the relaunched Idol on ABC, it has been reported that a 30-second spot may cost between $120,000–$160,000.

Media sponsorship
Ford Motor Company and Coca-Cola were two of the first sponsors of American Idol in its first season. The sponsorship deal cost around $10 million in the first season, rising to $35 million by the seventh season, and between $50 to $60 million in the tenth season. The third major sponsor AT&T Wireless joined in the second season but ended after the twelfth season, and Coca-Cola officially ended its sponsorship after the thirteenth season amidst the declining ratings of Idol in the mid-2010s. iTunes sponsored the show since the seventh season.American Idol prominent display of its sponsors' logo and products had been noted since the early seasons. By the sixth season, Idol showed 4,349 product placements according to Nielsen Media Research. The branded entertainment integration proved beneficial to its advertisers – promotion of AT&T text-messaging as a means to vote successfully introduced the technology into the wider culture, and Coca-Cola has seen its equity increased during the show.
 Coca-Cola – Cups bearing logo of Coca-Cola, and occasionally its subsidiary Vitaminwater, are featured prominently on the judges table. Contestants are shown between songs held in the "Coca-Cola Red Room", the show's equivalent of the green room. (The Coca-Cola logo however is obscured during rebroadcast in the UK which until 2011 banned product placement.)
 Ford – Contestants appear in the special Ford videos on the results shows, and winners Kelly Clarkson, Taylor Hicks, and Kris Allen have also appeared in commercials for Ford. The final two each won a free Ford Mustang in the fourth through sixth seasons, Ford Escape Hybrid in the seventh season, Ford Fusion Hybrid in the eighth season, Ford Fiesta in the ninth season, and 2013 Ford Fusion in the eleventh season. In the tenth season Scotty McCreery chose a Ford F-150 and Lauren Alaina chose Shelby Mustang. In the red room, there is a glass table with a Ford wheel as its base.
 AT&T – AT&T Mobility is promoted as the service provider for text-voting. AT&T created an ad campaign that centered on an air-headed teenager going around telling people to vote.
 Apple iTunes – Ryan Seacrest announces the availability of contestants' performances exclusively via iTunes. Videos are regularly shown of contestants learning their songs by rehearsing with iPods.
 Previous sponsors include Old Navy and Clairol's Herbal Essences. In the second and third seasons, contestants sometimes donned Old Navy clothing for their performances with celebrity stylist Steven Cojocaru assisting with their wardrobe selection, and contestants received Clairol-guided hair makeovers. In the seventh-season finale, both David Cook and David Archuleta appeared in "Risky Business"-inspired commercials for Guitar Hero, a sponsor of the tour that year.

Coca-Cola's archrival PepsiCo declined to sponsor American Idol at the show's start. What the Los Angeles Times later called "missing one of the biggest marketing opportunities in a generation" contributed to Pepsi losing market share, by 2010 falling to third place from second in the United States. PepsiCo sponsored the American version of Cowell's The X Factor in hopes of not repeating its Idol mistake until its cancellation.

For the revived series on ABC, Macy's and Johnson & Johnson's Zyrtec signed on as the major sponsors of the show.

American Idol tour

The top ten (eleven in the tenth season, five in the fourteenth season, and seven in the sixteenth season) toured at the end of every season except for the fifteenth and seventeenth seasons. In the twelfth season tour a semi-finalist who won a sing-off was also added to the tour. Kellogg's Pop-Tarts was the sponsor for the first seven seasons, and Guitar Hero was added for the seventh season tour. M&M's Pretzel Chocolate Candies was a sponsor of the ninth season tour. The fifth season tour was the most successful tour with gross of over $35 million.  However no concert tour was organized in the fifteenth and seventeenth seasons, the only seasons not to have an associated tour. The sixteenth season tour featured the band In Real Life as an opener on select dates.

Idol Gives BackIdol Gives Back was a special charity event started in season six featuring performances by celebrities and various fund-raising initiatives. This event was also held in seasons seven and nine and has raised nearly $185 million in total.

Music releasesAmerican Idol has traditionally released studio recordings of contestants' performances as well as the winner's coronation single for sale. For the first five seasons, the recordings were released as a compilation album at the end of the season. All five of these albums reached the top ten in Billboard 200 which made then American Idol the most successful soundtrack franchise of any motion picture or television program. Starting late in the fifth season, individual performances were released during the season as digital downloads, initially from the American Idol official website only. In the seventh season the live performances and studio recordings were made available during the season from iTunes when it joined as a sponsor. In the tenth season the weekly studio recordings were also released as compilation digital album straight after performance night.

19 Recordings, a recording label owned by 19 Entertainment, currently hold the rights to phonographic material recorded by all the contestants. 19 originally partnered with Bertelsmann Music Group (BMG) to promote and distribute the recordings through its labels RCA Records, Arista Records, J Records, Jive Records. In 2005–2007, BMG partnered with Sony Music Entertainment to form a joint venture known as Sony BMG Music Entertainment. From 2008 to 2010, Sony Music handled the distribution following their acquisition of BMG. Sony Music was partnered with American Idol and distribute its music, and In 2010, Sony was replaced by as the music label for American Idol by UMG's Interscope-Geffen-A&M Records.

Tie-ins'American Idol video games' American Idol – PlayStation 2, PC, Game Boy Advance, mobile phone
 Karaoke Revolution Presents American Idol – PlayStation 2
 Karaoke Revolution Presents American Idol Encore – PlayStation 2, PlayStation 3, Wii, Xbox 360
 Karaoke Revolution Presents American Idol Encore 2 – PlayStation 3, Wii, Xbox 360

Theme park attraction

On February 14, 2009, The Walt Disney Company debuted "The American Idol Experience" at its Disney's Hollywood Studios theme park at the Walt Disney World Resort in Florida. In this live production, co-produced by 19 Entertainment, park guests chose from a list of songs and auditioned privately for Disney cast members. Those selected then performed on a stage in a 1000-seat theater replicating the Idol set. Three judges, whose mannerisms and style mimicked those of the real Idol judges, critiqued the performances. Audience members then voted for their favorite performer. There were several preliminary-round shows during the day that culminated in a "finals" show in the evening where one of the winners of the previous rounds that day was selected as the overall winner. The winner of the finals show received a "Dream Ticket" that granted them front-of-the-line privileges at any future American Idol audition. The attraction closed on August 30, 2014.

Other broadcastsAmerican Idol is broadcast to over 100 nations worldwide. In most nations these are not live broadcasts and may be tape delayed by several days or weeks, except for other season finales that are aired live in several countries simulcast with the U.S. broadcast on Fox (2002–2016) and ABC (since 2018). In Canada, the first thirteen seasons of American Idol were aired live countrywide by CTV and/or CTV Two, in simulcast with Fox. CTV dropped Idol after its thirteenth season and in August 2014, Yes TV announced that it had picked up Canadian rights to American Idol beginning in its 2015 season. In 2017, it was announced the show would return to CTV Two for its sixteenth season. Since season nineteen, the show started airing on Citytv.

In Latin America, the show is broadcast and subtitled by Sony Entertainment Television. In Southeast Asia, it is broadcast by Sony Channel every Monday and Tuesday nine or ten hours after since its revival. In Philippines, it is aired every Thursday and Friday nine or ten hours after its United States telecast; from 2004 to 2007 on ABC 5; 2008–11 on QTV, then GMA News TV; and 2012–16, 2018–19 on ETC. In Indonesia, it was aired on RCTI in the 2002 to 2003 season with the Indonesian subtitles, before the Indonesian version of Idols was held in the 2004, aired after each episode ended, and in the 2011 to 2013 season it was broadcast by B-Channel (now RTV). In Australia, it aired a few hours after the U.S. telecast. It was aired on Network Ten from 2002 to 2008 and then again in 2013. Between 2008 and 2012 it aired on Fox8 and the thirteenth and fourteenth seasons (2014–15) it aired on digital channel, Eleven, a sister channel to Network Ten. Its final season (2016) aired on Fox8 hours after the original U.S. broadcast. The show enjoyed a lot of popularity in Australia throughout the 2000s before declining in the ratings. In the United Kingdom, episodes were aired one day after the U.S. broadcast on digital channel ITV2. In the twelfth season, the episodes aired on 5*. It was also aired in Ireland on TV3 two days after the telecast. In Brazil and Israel, the show airs two days after its original broadcast, and broadcast live during the season finale. In the instances where the airing is delayed, the shows may sometimes be combined into one episode to summarize the results. In Italy, the twelfth season was broadcast by La3. In Singapore, The show was broadcast on Mediacorp Channel 5 for the ninth and tenth seasons.

Spin-offsIdol: The Musical 
 American Juniors American Idol Rewind American Idol Extra The Next Great American Band From Justin to Kelly An American Idol Christmas Idol Camp Idol Wrap''

See also
 List of American Idol finalists
 List of awards and nominations for American Idol contestants

References

External links 

 
 
 
 
 American Idol Episodes on Fox (TV Guide)

 
2000s American music television series
2002 American television series debuts
2010s American music television series
2020s American music television series
2016 American television series endings
2018 American television series debuts
Competitions
English-language television shows
American live television shows
Music competitions in the United States
Nielsen ratings winners
Primetime Emmy Award-winning television series
American television series revived after cancellation
Fox Broadcasting Company original programming
American Broadcasting Company original programming
American television series based on British television series
Television series by Fremantle (company)
Singing talent shows